Krzynowłoga Mała  is a former town, now a village in Przasnysz County, Masovian Voivodeship, in east-central Poland. It is the seat of the gmina (administrative district) called Gmina Krzynowłoga Mała.

The village has a population of 520.

During Nazi Occupation it was part of New Berlin military training area

References

Villages in Przasnysz County